Hindustan Construction Company Limited (HCC) is an Indian Engineering, Procurement, Construction, and Project Management companies. It is headquartered in Mumbai. HCC was founded by Industrialist Seth Walchand Hirachand in 1926.

HCC has executed a majority of India’s landmark infrastructure projects, including 29% of India’s hydropower capacity, over 65% of India’s nuclear power generation capacity, 3,800 km of roads and expressways, 375 bridges and 337 km of complex tunnelling.

Ajit Gulabchand is Chairman and Managing Director of HCC. Arjun Dhawan is Executive Vice Chairman.

Our Founder: Seth Walchand Hirachand 
Seth Walchand Hirachand is widely hailed as the Father of the Indian Transportation Industry. He is remembered as the man who took an ambitious yet pragmatic stand in challenging British monopolies, a feat that resulted in India’s first shipyard, aircraft factory and automobile factory.

He began his entrepreneurial foray in the Construction industry, first as a railway contractor and then as a contractor to other departments of Government.  Some of the major projects executed by him include tunnelling through the Bhor Ghats for a railway route from Mumbai to Pune and laying of water pipes from Tansa lake to Mumbai. Other major projects executed by him include the Kalabag Bridge over the Indus River and a bridge across the Irrawaddy River in Burma.

A proud son of India, Seth Walchand Hirachand led the battle against undue restrictions on Indian entrepreneurship during the freedom struggle. A daring visionary, his firm belief that Indian businessmen could compete with the best in the world underscored his successful forays into uncharted waters.

By the end of his journey, Seth Walchand Hirachand had created enterprises that spanned the entire industrial spectrum, including Construction, Shipping, Engineering, Agriculture and Agricultural Products, Automobiles, Aerospace, and Finance.

History 
HCC was incorporated in 1926, when it received a contract to construct the Bhor Ghat Tunnel on the Mumbai-Pune railway line. The tunnel was completed in 1928.

In 1993, Ajit Gulabchand came out of an internal Walachand family struggle with control of the HCC. It was reported that few wanted control of the company with a turnover of 125 crore and profits of less than 5 crores at that time.

 1954 - Maharashtra's first dam after independence: Vaitarna dam, Maharashtra
 1954 - India's first bridge: railway bridge across river Torsa, Assam
 1954 - India's first water treatment plant in Mumbai
 1956 - India's first thermal plant for Tata, Mumbai
 1966 - India's first barrage: Sone barrage, Bihar
 1967 - India's first port: impounded dock for Haldia, West Bengal
 1971 - World’s longest barrage: Farakka barrage, West Bengal
 1971 - India's first nuclear power plant: Rajasthan Atomic Power Project – Unit 1&2
 1971 - India’s first integrated steel plant: Bhilai, Madhya Pradesh
 1975 - India's first underground power house: Yamuna Power House, Uttarakhand
 1977 - Idukki double curvature dam, Kerala
 1983 - India’s largest water treatment plant: Bhandup, Mumbai
 1983 - India’s largest rail coach factory in Kapurthala, Punjab
 2009 - India’s first Sea Link bridge: Bandra Worli Sea Link, Mumbai
 2010 - India's largest nuclear power plant: Kundankulam nuclear power plant, Tamil Nadu
 2011 – India’s first strategic crude oil storage cavern: Vizag Oil Cavern; Andhra Pradesh
 2012 – India's highest altitude Hydro Power projects: Nimoo Bazgo & Chutak Hydro Power Projects, Jammu & Kashmir
 2013 – India’s longest transportation tunnel: Pir Panjal Railway Tunnel, Jammu & Kashmir 
 2014 – India’s second strategic crude oil storage cavern: Padur Oil Cavern, Karnataka
 2016 – NHPC’s first RCC dam: Teesta Low Dam Stage IV Project, West Bengal
 2018 – Largest EPC contract of NHPC: Kishanganga Hydro Power Project, J&K
 2018 – India’s longest Rail-cum-road Bridge: Bogibeel Bridge; Assam

Expertise 
HCC develops and executes technically complex, high-value projects that span across diverse segments such as transportation, power, marine projects, irrigation and water supply, special buildings and industrial plants. HCC’s projects are hallmarks of quality, excellence, and precision; the company has delivered numerous engineering marvels within each of its respective segments.

 Transportation: HCC caters to all segments of the transportation sector and has executed numerous technologically complex projects including metro rails, bridges, highways, tunnels, sea-links, ports and marine projects. HCC has built more than 4,036 lane kms of highways spanning the length and breadth of India in the form of Expressways, National Highways, State Highways and Port approach systems.
 Hydropower: HCC possesses the skill, scale and speed to address every aspect of a hydropower project including dams, barrages, powerhouses, shafts, tunnels, canals etc. The company has built 4 out of 10 highest concrete dams, 2 out of 5 largest underground power stations and 365 km of tunnels out of which 206 km is in complex Himalayan geology. It has constructed 50 dams and barrages, 23 surface and underground power stations and 7 EPC hydropower projects.
 Nuclear Power: HCC has been the construction partner of choice since the birth of India’s nuclear program. The company specialises in the construction of reactor buildings, turbine buildings, balance of plants, make-up water systems, cooling towers and chimneys. It has constructed India’s first indigenously built nuclear power plant at Kota. So far HCC has built 17 out of 24 nuclear reactors in India.
 Irrigation and Water Supply: HCC specialises in the execution of large, complex integrated water management projects on EPC basis, from source development till commissioning. HCC has constructed dams and barrages, aqueducts, sewage treatment plants, integrated water schemes, canals and pumping stations. Till date, it has constructed 7 irrigation dams, 21 barrages, 105 water/sewage treatment plants and 460 km pipelines.
 Buildings and Industrial plants: HCC is a leader in specialized buildings and industrial buildings due to its precision engineering capabilities and speed of implementation. A total of 109 such buildings have been constructed over the last seven years, measuring 7.5 million sq ft, which includes smart city development of 4.4 million sq. ft., 47 Power plant buildings, 18 Metro station buildings, 19 Industrial buildings, 14 Commercial and Residential buildings and 11 Institutional buildings.

HCC has remained at the forefront of India’s engineering construction industry with global management practices, which include international ISO certifications for management systems in Quality, Occupational Health & Safety and Environment. Sustainability is not merely a buzzword at HCC, but rather a living purpose. The company has implemented many important initiatives through the government-recognized Centre for Research and Development and Innovation (CRDI) towards this end, including the use of fly ash in concrete that helps reduce carbon emissions (78,000 tons of CO2 equivalent in last 5 years) and innovative techniques in pipeline joint testing (helped save 99% of water).

Safety First 
At HCC, safety is of paramount importance. The company endeavours to achieve 'zero reportable injuries' at each work site. Over the years, progressive initiatives have been undertaken to continually improve safety performance, including mandatory induction training programmes, toolbox talks, training in usage of personal protective equipment etc.

Besides these initiatives, HCC has undertaken a behaviour Based Safety Programme that brought about a paradigm shift in the way safety is observed at sites. The programme analyses cause of possible accidents, near-misses, unsafe conditions and unsafe acts. Each of these causes is systematically reported and corresponding actions are taken to mitigate the possibility of an accident.

Key Projects Executed by HCC 

Some projects executed by HCC include:
Transportation:

 Allahabad Bypass, Uttar Pradesh
 Bandra-Worli Sea Link, Maharashtra
 Bhorghat Tunnel, Maharashtra
 Bogibeel Rail-cum-Road Bridge, Assam
 Chambal Bridge at Dholpur, Rajasthan
 Chennai Bypass, Tamil Nadu
 Chennai Ore Berth, Jetty, Wharf, Tamil Nadu
 Delhi Faridabad Elevated Expressway
 DMRC - Airport Metro Express Line, Delhi
 DMRC - Janakpuri West to Palam Station, Delhi
 DMRC - Netaji Subhash Place to Shalimar Bagh, Delhi
 DMRC - Vishwa Vidyalaya to ISBT, Delhi
 East-West Corridor Project, Rajasthan
 Elevated Road from Park Circus to E.M. Bypass, Kolkata, West Bengal
 Ganga Bridge at Mokameh, Bihar
 Goa Barge Berth at Marmugoa
 Godavari Railway Bridge, Andhra Pradesh
 Golden Quadrilateral Road Project - Kolaghat to Kharagpur, West Bengal
 Grand Trunk Road Improvement Project, Jharkhand
 Haldia Docks Project, West Bengal
 Kalyani Bridge, West Bengal
 Karnataka State Highways Project, Karnataka
 Kolia Bhomora Setu, Tezpur, Assam
 Kolkata Metro, West Bengal
 Mehsana to Palanpur Highway, Gujarat
 Mughal Road, Jammu & Kashmir
 Mumbai Metro One, Maharashtra
 Mumbai-Pune Expressway, Maharashtra
 Munger Rail-cum-Road Bridge, Bihar
 Naini Cable Stayed Bridge, Uttar Pradesh
 NH - 28 - Lucknow Muzaffarpur Highway, Uttar Pradesh
 NH-3 MP/Maharashtra Border - Dhule Highway, Maharashtra
 NH-34 - Bahrampore – Farakka Highway, West Bengal
 NH-34 - Farakka - Raiganj Highway, West Bengal
 NH-4 - Satara Kolhapur Highway, Maharashtra
 NH-54 - Maibang to Nirmbanglo Highway, Assam
 North-South Corridor NHDP Phase II Package AP-8, Telangana
 Paradip Port Road, Orissa
 Pir Panjal Tunnel, Jammu & Kashmir
 Pune Paud Road, Maharashtra
 Road Bridge across Mahanadi, Orissa
 Road Bridge at Palwai, Haryana
 Road Bridge over River Indravati, Madhya Pradesh
 Saraighat Bridge, Assam
 Tanker Terminal and Fertiliser Berth, Cochin, Kerala
 Tapi Road Bridge, Gujarat
 Varanasi Bridge, Uttar Pradesh
 Wellington Bridge, Cochin, Kerala

Hydro Power

 Chamera Hydro Power Project Stage I, Himachal Pradesh
 Chamera Hydro Power Project, Stage III, Himachal Pradesh
 Chandil Dam, Jharkhand
 Chutak Hydro Power Project, Jammu & Kashmir
 Dagachhu Hydro Power Project, Bhutan
 Dam across Idamalayar, Kerala
 Dam across Moozhiyar and Veluthodu, Kerala
 Kadra Dam, Karnataka
 Kashang Hydro Power Project, Himachal Pradesh
 Kishanganga Hydro Power Project, Jammu & Kashmir
 Koyna Hydro Power Project Stage I to IV, Maharashtra
 Kurichhu Hydro Power Project, Bhutan
 Lower Mettur Hydro Power Project, Tamil Nadu
 Lower Periyar Hydro Power Project, Kerala
 Maneri Bhali Hydroelectric Power Project, Uttar Pradesh
 Nathpa Jhakri Hydro Power Project, Himachal Pradesh
 Nimoo Bazgo Hydro Power Project, Jammu & Kashmir
 Papavinasam Dam, Andhra Pradesh
 Pare Hydro Power Project, Arunachal Pradesh
 Rihand Dam, Uttar Pradesh
 Sainj Hydro Power Project, Himachal Pradesh
 Salal Hydro Power Project, Jammu & Kashmir
 Sebarigiri Dam, Kerala
 Sharavati Hydro Power Project, Karnataka
 Tala Hydro Power Project, Bhutan
 Teesta Low Dam Hydro Power Project Stage IV, West Bengal
 Tons Hydro Power Project, Madhya Pradesh
 Uri-II Hydro Power Project, Jammu & Kashmir
 Yamuna Hydro Power Project, Uttar Pradesh

Nuclear and Special Projects

 140 m High Chimney at Ropar, Punjab
 Barauni Thermal Power Plant, Bihar
 BARC - Reactor, Lab & Spent Fuel Building, Maharashtra
 Brahmapuram Diesel Power Plant, Kerala
 Cavern for Crude Oil Storage, Padur, Karnataka
 Cavern for Crude Oil Storage, Vishakhapatnam, Andhra Pradesh
 Chimney at Vijayawada, Andhra Pradesh
 Ennore Port-Rock Quarrying & Breakwater, Tamil Nadu
 IOCL Refinery at Guwahati, Assam
 Kakrapar Atomic Power Project, Gujarat
 Kalol Mehsana Gas Pipeline, Gujarat
 Kudankulam Nuclear Power Project, Units 1 & 2, Tamil Nadu
 Muzaffarpur Thermal Power Plant, Bihar
 Narora Atomic Power Project, Uttar Pradesh
 Panipat Chimney, Haryana
 Rajasthan Atomic Power Project, Units 1 & 2, Rajasthan
 Rajasthan Atomic Power Project, Units 3 & 4, Rajasthan
 Rajasthan Atomic Power Project, Units 5 & 6, Rajasthan
 Ramagundam Thermal Power Project, Telangana
 Satpura Thermal Power Station, Madhya Pradesh
 Trombay Chimney Works, Maharashtra

Water Solutions

 Aerated Lagoons, Mumbai, Maharashtra
 Ambernath/Ulhasnagar STP, Maharashtra
 Bandra Effluent and Influent Disposal, Mumbai, Maharashtra
 Bhama Askhed Pipeline, Maharashtra
 Bhandup Pipeline, Maharashtra
 Bhandup Water Treatment Complex, Maharashtra
 Dam at Upper Kolab, Orissa
 Farakka Barrage, West Bengal
 Ghatkopar High Level Water Tunnel, Maharashtra
 Godavari Barrage at Rajahmundry, Andhra Pradesh
 Gomti Aqueduct, Uttar Pradesh
 Hathnikund Barrage, Haryana
 JCR Devadula Lift Irrigation Scheme Phase I, Telangana
 JCR Devadula Lift Irrigation Scheme Phase II, Telangana
 Kachchh Branch Canal, Gujarat
 Kadamparai Pumped Storage Project, Tamil Nadu
 Mahananda Barrage, West Bengal
 Middle Vaitarna Water Pipeline, Maharashtra
 Naraj Barrage, New Cuttack, Orissa
 Navamalai Irrigation Tunnel, Tamil Nadu
 Nhava Sheva WTP Works, Raigadh, Maharashtra
 Polavaram - Right Main Canal, Andhra Pradesh
 Pumped Water Supply Scheme from Kesaria to Sonari, Gujarat
 Purulia Pumped Storage Project, West Bengal
 Rihand STPP, Uttar Pradesh
 Sai Aqueduct, Uttar Pradesh
 Saurashtra Branch Canal, Gujarat
 Sharda and Ghogra Barrages, Uttar Pradesh
 Sone Barrage, Bihar
 Swarnim Gujarat Kutch Water Grid, Gujarat
 Teesta Barrage, West Bengal
 Tirupur Water Supply Project, Tamil Nadu
 Upper Nirar Irrigation Tunnel, Tamil Nadu
 Vaitarna Dam, Maharashtra
 Water & Sewage Treatment Plants at Okhla, Tihar Jail, Wazirabad, Delhi
 Water Supply Tunnel from Bhandup to Charkop, Mumbai, Maharashtra
 Water Treatment Plant, Pune, Maharashtra
 Water Tunnel between E Moses Road and Ruparel College, Mumbai, Maharashtra
 Water Tunnel between Sewri and Futka, Maharashtra
 Water Tunnel from Maroshi to Ruparel College, Mumbai, Maharashtra

Buildings and Industrial Projects

 Aditya Aluminium Project, Orissa
 Bhilai Steel Plant, Chhattisgarh
 Factory Civil Works for Premier Automobiles Limited, Maharashtra
 Rail Coach Factory at Kapurthala, Punjab
 Reliance J3 Refinery at Jamnagar, Gujarat
 Surveillance Facility Project at Tarapur, Maharashtra

HCC Subsidiaries 
HCC Infrastructure Co. Ltd. is a leading infrastructure developer engaged in the creation and management of premium assets in transportation. HCC Infrastructure has developed and operated approx Rs.7,000 crore of infrastructure concessions through Public Private Partnership (PPP) with the Indian Government.

Steiner AG is Switzerland’s second largest building construction company. With a heritage of nearly 100 years, Steiner specializes in the turnkey development of new buildings and renovations and offers services in all facets of real estate development and construction. The subsidiary has registered a revenue of CHF806 million (Rs.6,015 crore) in FY 2021-22. The order backlog stood at CHF1 billion (Rs.8,041 crore) at the end of the financial year.

References

External links 
 

Construction and civil engineering companies of India
Companies based in Mumbai
Construction and civil engineering companies established in 1926
1926 establishments in British India
Walchand Group
Indian companies established in 1926
Companies listed on the National Stock Exchange of India
Companies listed on the Bombay Stock Exchange